TYGA FM (call sign: 7TYG) is a community radio station located in New Norfolk, Tasmania, Australia, broadcasting on 98.9 MHz.

History 

TYGA FM is a community radio station operated by Derwent Valley Community Radio Inc and began transmitting on Monday, 14 December 2009, at 10:00 am. The station moved to the New Norfolk High School's Science & Language Centre in a purpose-built facility in 2012. In 2020 the station moved to its current home in the former court house at 1 Circle Street, New Norfolk. TYGA FM aims to provide a community radio service to residents of the Derwent Valley and Southern Central Highlands. The station now provides a wide variety of different programs hosted by a variety of presenters and broadcasts 24 hours a day 7 days a week.

External links
TYGA FM Website
Community Broadcasting Association Of Australia

Radio stations in Hobart
Community radio stations in Australia